This is a list of awards that Pixar has won, or were nominated for.

Feature films

Pixar has released 26 feature films with 210 awards won and 211 awards nominated. The films released are: Toy Story, A Bug's Life, Toy Story 2, Monsters, Inc., Finding Nemo, The Incredibles, Cars, Ratatouille, WALL-E, Up, Toy Story 3, Cars 2, Brave, Monsters University, Inside Out, The Good Dinosaur, Finding Dory, Cars 3, Coco, Incredibles 2, Toy Story 4, Onward, Soul, Luca, Turning Red, and Lightyear.

Short films

With each feature film released on DVD or Blu-ray, Pixar releases a short film. The shorts received many awards.

See also
 List of Pixar films
 List of Pixar shorts